Dance Session is an album by pianist/bandleader Count Basie recorded in 1953 and became Basie's first 12-inch LP when it was originally released on the Clef label. Selections from this album were also released on the 1956 Clef LPs Basie Roars Again and King of Swing.

Track listing
 "Straight Life" (Johnny Mandel) - 4:33
 "Basie Goes Wess" (Frank Wess) - 3:52
 "Softly, With Feeling" (Neal Hefti) - 3:05
 "Peace Pipe" (Ernie Wilkins) - 2:28
 "Blues Go Away!" (Wilkins) - 3:19
 "Cherry Point" (Hefti) - 3:19
 "Bubbles" (Hefti) - 4:05
 "Right On" (Freddie Green) - 2:39
 "The Blues Done Come Back" (Wilkins) - 3:37
 "Plymouth Rock" (Hefti) - 3:42 
Recorded in Los Angeles, CA on August 13 (tracks 5 & 10) and at Fine Sound Studios in New York City on December 12 (tracks 1-4 & 6–9), 1953

Personnel 
Count Basie - piano, organ
Paul Campbell (tracks 5 & 10), Wendell Culley, Reunald Jones, Joe Newman, Joe Wilder (tracks 1-4 & 6–9) - trumpet
Johnny Mandel - bass trumpet,  arranger (tracks 5 & 10)
Henderson Chambers (tracks 1-4 & 6–9), Henry Coker, Benny Powell - trombone 
Marshall Royal - alto saxophone, clarinet 
Ernie Wilkins -  alto saxophone, tenor saxophone, arranger 
Frank Wess - tenor saxophone, arranger
Frank Foster - tenor saxophone
Charlie Fowlkes - baritone saxophone 
Freddie Green - guitar, arranger 
Eddie Jones- bass
Gus Johnson - drums
Neal Hefti - arranger

References 

1954 albums
Count Basie Orchestra albums
Clef Records albums
Verve Records albums
Albums arranged by Ernie Wilkins
Albums arranged by Frank Foster (musician)
Albums arranged by Neal Hefti
Albums arranged by Johnny Mandel
Albums produced by Norman Granz